= Ajdarra =

- Location within Pakistan
- Coordinates: 32.51°N 69.84°E
- Country: Pakistan
- Provinc e: Khyber Pakhtunkhwa
- Elevation: 836 m (2,743 ft)
- Time zone: UTC+5 (PST)
  - Summer (DST): UTC+6 (PDT)

Ajdarra is a town in the Khyber Pakhtunkhwa province of Pakistan. It is located at 34° 35'40″ N, 71° 27' 45″ E with an altitude of 836 metres (2,746 feet).
